Yongsan is a constituency of the National Assembly of South Korea. The constituency only consists of the Yongsan District, Seoul. As of 2017, 197,962 eligible voters were registered in the constituency.

List of members of the National Assembly

Election results

2020

2016

2012

2008

2004

2000

1996

1992

1988

Notes

References 

Constituencies of the National Assembly (South Korea)